The Burning Wheel is a fantasy tabletop role-playing game independently written and published by Luke Crane. The game uses a dice pool mechanic (using only standard six-sided dice) for task resolution and a character generation system that tracks the history and experiences of new characters from birth to the point they begin adventuring.

The Burning Wheel does not include a dedicated setting. The rules, mechanics and backstory elements used in character generation imply a fantasy world by default, but can be easily modified, and the game includes mechanics for players to generate their own setting content during play, in the form of Wises and Circles tests.

The core game includes two volumes: The Burning Wheel, containing rules and mechanics, and the Character Burner, with additional rules and biographic elements for generating Humans, Dwarves, Elves, and Orcs as characters, providing each with unique exceptions or additions to the overall game mechanics. Humans have access to Sorcery and miraculous Faith, Elves have a Grief statistic and spell-songs, Dwarves have Greed, and Orcs have blasphemous Hatred.

The Monster Burner supplement includes premade monsters as well as mechanics and backstories for designing and building custom monsters, allowing the game to cover a much broader range of adventure and setting. This volume also contains four new and complete races for Burning Wheel: Great Wolves, Roden (anthropomorphic rats), Great Spiders, and Trolls.

The Magic Burner supplement was released in August 2008. It expands the limited rules found in the main rule book by describing a variety of potential metaphysical sources of magic, with associated rules on how those affect what spells can do and how they are cast. The book also contains additional traits and skills useful for magic-wielding characters and a system for creating custom spells.

The Adventure Burner supplement was released in July 2010. It includes three ready-to-play scenarios, a host of pregenerated character templates for all officially supported races, and an extensive Commentary section that provides advice about how best to play the game and use the system for fun and challenge.

The game has had three dedicated settings:

January 2004: Under a Serpent Sun, described as "suicidal despair in a post-apocalyptic wasteland".

August 2005: Burning Sands: Jihad, a science fiction expansion of galaxy-spanning religious war. A blog associated with the creators of Burning Wheel describes this expansion as being based on the Dune series.

August 2007: The Blossoms are Falling, based in Heian-era Japan.  "You play fearsome bushi trapped between honor and shame, wise Shinto priests who seek to placate the spirits who protect Nihon, powerful Buddhist monks who pray for the souls of the dead while plying strong influence at court, and powerful courtiers battling for control of the failing state."

Game mechanics and philosophy 
Burning Wheel play revolves around the players generating a detailed background history for their characters, along with core motivations and ethics (Instincts and Beliefs) that connect them to the storyline and to the other PCs.  Story is intended to develop organically rather than being pre-scripted, as a number of the game mechanics (e.g., pre-negotiated roll or scene outcomes, the 'Let it Ride' rule, absence of hidden information) exist to prevent GM railroading and help promote co-operation and trust between the players.  (This is quite distinct from agreement among the PCs, who may argue and even fight within the context of the rules.)

The GM is encouraged to create problems and challenges that specifically probe and test the Beliefs and Instincts of the PCs, and as a consequence characters frequently undergo significant change in their goals and attitudes over time.

The game also includes a variety of quite complex, but technically optional, sub-systems for dealing with combat, chases, negotiation and spellcasting.

Editions 
The original rules (now referred to as Burning Wheel Classic) were published 1 November 2002. A second edition, incorporating significant rules and text changes and generally referred to as Burning Wheel Revised, was published 5 May 2005. A single-volume 600-page hardcover third edition, Burning Wheel Gold, combined the contents of Burning Wheel Revised and Character Burner and was published 11 August 2011. In every case, the actual name of the game, as displayed on the cover art, is simply The Burning Wheel. The three editions share many underlying concepts, but their rules are not entirely compatible.
Following a successful Kickstarter campaign in 2016, a second book pertaining to the "Burning Wheel Gold" edition line was edited, the "Burning Wheel Codex". The "Burning Wheel Codex" updates the material from the Adventure, Monster and Magic Burner books for the previous Revised edition to the Gold rules, and also adds some new, original material and artwork.

Related games 
Luke Crane also wrote Burning Empires, a science fiction RPG based on the Iron Empires graphic novels by Christopher Moeller.  Burning Empires shares many mechanics with Burning Wheel, and was released at Gen Con 2006.

Luke has penned another full game, entitled Mouse Guard, which uses a simplified version of the Burning Wheel system and is set in the world of the Mouse Guard comics.  It won Best Role-Playing Game at the 2009 Origins Awards.
Another game in this line is Torchbearer.

Reviews
Pyramid - Revised

References

External links 
 Official Site

Indie role-playing games
Fantasy role-playing games
Role-playing games introduced in 2002